La Belgique Horticole ("Horticultural Belgium") was an illustrated horticultural review published in Liège, Belgium, from 1851 to 1885. For the first four years it was edited by Charles Morren, director of the Botanical Garden of Liège. From 1855 to 1857 editorship was shared jointly with his son and successor Édouard Morren, who continued as sole editor after his father's death in 1858.

Illustrators
Illustrators and engravers who worked for La Belgique Horticole included Erin Corr, Jozef Linnig, Guillaume Severeyns and Michael Verzwyvel.

References

External links
 On Google Books: vol. 1 (1851), vol. 2 (1852), vol. 3 (1853), vol. 4 (1854), vol. 5 (1855), vol. 6 (1856), vol. 7 (1857), vol. 8 (1858), vol. 9 (1859), vol. 10 (1860), vol. 11 (1861), vol. 12 (1862)

Horticultural magazines
Magazines established in 1851
Magazines disestablished in 1885
1851 establishments in Belgium
1885 disestablishments in Belgium